"Excerpt from 'A Teenage Opera'" (also known as "Grocer Jack") is a 1967 single by Keith West, produced by Mark Wirtz. It was a big hit in Europe, peaking at number 2 on the UK Singles Chart. The single was  part of a bigger "A Teenage Opera" project.  The song was written by Wirtz and West, credited as "Philwit / Hopkins".

History
According to Mark Wirtz, the song comes from a dream he had about an ageing door-to-door grocer named Jack in a small, turn of the 20th century village, who was mocked by the children as he was taken for granted by the town folk. When Jack unexpectedly died, the town folk reacted with anger about the inconvenience of now having to be self-reliant about their staple provisions, while the children were heartbroken, in truth having loved and appreciated Jack all the while.

Working with EMI recording engineer Geoff Emerick at Abbey Road Studios on a project called Mood Mosaic, Wirtz developed the idea which he called "Excerpt from A Teenage Opera" because, he said: "That way, if the single is a hit, people will want an entire LP of the whole opera".  The recording used the voices of children from the Corona Academy, with Keith West of the band Tomorrow, with whom Wirtz was also working, as lead vocalist, and his bandmate Steve Howe on guitar.  At first, EMI executives were critical of the use of children's voices on a supposedly "rock" record, but Wirtz played an acetate of the record to Radio London DJ John Peel, who loved it and played it on his show.  After its eventual release, it climbed the UK singles chart, reaching number 2 in September 1967 (behind "The Last Waltz" by Engelbert Humperdinck).  The single was a major hit in Europe, but in the US only reached number 109.

According to Wirtz, EMI treated the single as a one-off novelty, and refused to give the go-ahead for a full album until there had been a second hit single.  Wirtz turned down an offer from Robert Stigwood to help develop the project.  He continued to work on the project, which he intended to be "a kaleidoscope of stories, a bouquet of allegorical, tragiccomic tales about a variety of characters and their fate, all related to each other by the common thread of living in the same imaginary turn-of the-century village. Each character distinguished him/herself by rebelliously pursuing a dream or lifestyle against all odds and in defiance of conformity, their ageless celebration of youth and individuality embodying the very spirit of Rock’n’Roll."  However, Wirtz became involved in a contractual dispute with EMI, and the ending of the offshore radio stations around the UK with the introduction of Radio 1 led to changes in the company's marketing approach.  The second single from the proposed Teenage Opera, "Sam", was only a modest hit, and Wirtz and West lost interest in the project and ended their working partnership.

In 2000, Wirtz wrote: "Quintessentially, what killed Teenage Opera was EMI’s blind and stubborn procrastination and political tomfoolery, which ultimately shot us all to shit. Nevertheless, even in its incomplete form and ultimate failure, Teenage Opera entered the history books as a bright torch and shining star, having set a precedent and broken down barriers to pave the way for others to succeed where I had failed."

Cultural references

The song was namechecked on Half Man Half Biscuit's song 'Our Tune' from the album McIntyre, Treadmore and Davitt (1991), the last lines of which are "Grocer Jack! Grocer Jack! Get off your back! Go into town!" from the chorus, except bellowed rather than sung.

Chart performance

References

1967 singles
Keith West songs
1967 songs
Parlophone singles
Song recordings with Wall of Sound arrangements